WCVV (89.5 FM) is a radio station licensed to Belpre, Ohio, United States. The station serves the Parkersburg-Marietta area.  The station is currently owned by Belpre Educational Broadcasting Foundation.

References

External links

Bible Broadcasting Network
Radio stations established in 1971
CVV